Cantar-Galo e Vila do Carvalho is a civil parish in the municipality of Covilhã, Portugal. It was formed in 2013 by the merger of the former parishes Cantar-Galo and Vila do Carvalho.

References

Freguesias of Covilhã